Troitsky  (Тро́ицкий, masculine), Troitskaya (Тро́ицкая, feminine), or Troitskoye (Тро́ицкое, neuter) is a Russian clerical surname derived from Troitsa (Тро́ица) meaning Trinity. It may refer to:

People 
Aleksei Troitsky (footballer) (1894–1958), Russian and Soviet soccer player
Alexey Troitsky (1866–1942), Russian chess problemist
Artemy Troitsky (born 1955), Russian music critic, whose name was originally Artem
Sergey Viktorovich Troitskiy (1878–1972), Russian-born Serbian theologian; great-grandfather of Viktor
Viktor Troicki (born 1986), Serbian tennis player; great-grandson of Sergey

Places 
Troitsky Okrug (disambiguation), name of several divisions in Russia
Troitsky District, name of several districts in Russia
Troitsky, Russia (Troitskaya, Troitskoye), name of several rural localities in Russia
, a village in the Almaty Province, Kazakhstan

Other 
Troitskaya tower, one of the Kremlin towers

See also
 Troitsk
 Troitske
 Novotroitsky